The Panel for the Future of Science and Technology (STOA) is a panel of 27 members of the European Parliament devoted to all issues related to science and technology assessment.

Role

STOA is an official organ of the European Parliament, responsible for technology assessment and is active since 1987. Its task is to carry out expert, independent assessments of the impact of new technologies and identify long-term, strategic policy options useful to the Parliament's committees in their policy-making role.
STOA's work is carried out in partnership with external experts. These can be research institutes, universities, laboratories, consultancies or individual researchers contracted to help prepare specific projects. STOA increasingly focuses upon round-table expert discussions, conferences and workshops with associated or consequent studies. Members of Parliament (MEPs) and invited experts from EU institutions, international institutions, universities, specialist institutes, academies and other sources of expertise worldwide can jointly participate in the analysis of current issues at these events.

The European Parliament defines its position on these issues through reports prepared by its Committees. If Committees decide that it would be helpful to their policy making role to seek out expert, independent assessments of the various scientific or technological options in the policy sectors concerned, they have STOA at their disposal.

Organisation
The STOA Panel is politically responsible for STOA's work. The STOA Panel consists of 27 Members of the European Parliament, namely the vice-president of the Parliament responsible for STOA, and six members of the Committee on Industry, Research and Energy (ITRE); three members from each of these Committees: Environment, Public Health and Food safety (ENVI), Internal Market and Consumer Protection (IMCO), Employment and Social Affairs (EMPL), Transport and Tourism (TRAN), Agriculture and Rural Development (AGRI) and one member from each of these Committees: Civili Liberties, Justice & Home Affairs (LIBE), Legal Affairs (JURI), Culture and Education (CULT), Regional Development (REGI), and International Trade (INTA).

The STOA Bureau runs the activities of STOA and prepares the Panel meetings. The STOA Bureau is elected by the STOA Panel. 
Currently, the chair is Christian EHLER of EPP, Germany. The two Vice-Chairs are Ivo HRISTOV of S&D, Austria, and Ivars IJABS of Renew Europe, Latvia. The fourth member of the STOA Bureau is the vice-president of the European Parliament responsible for STOA.

The Panel is also overseeing the work of the European Science-Media Hub (ESMH), a platform aiming to create a community of scientists, politicians and journalists in order to ensure that scientific insights are made available to policymakers, media and the wider public. The ESMH uses media monitoring and media intelligence tools, and works with science writers, to regularly update its website with a press review and articles on science and technology topics that attract media attention and are important in the European context. It also offers training and networking opportunities for journalists and other communication practitioners on current technological developments, both as subjects of their reporting and as means of facilitating their work.

Activities 
Based upon the needs expressed by the different parliamentary committees, STOA provides the parliamentary bodies with independent, high-quality and impartial scientific information and studies. This helps them to assess the impact of the introduction or promotion of new technologies, and identify from a technological point of view, the best possible options for action. All STOA publications are available to everyone on the STOA website.

To raise public awareness of and interest in science and technology issues, STOA hosts an Annual Lecture. The event features eminent scientists – often Nobel Prize laureates – speaking about subjects placed high on the political agenda, such as the information society, oil-free future, sustainability, advances in medical research, as well as major discoveries in fundamental science. The event is open to the public. Recent Annual Lectures have dealt with:

 'The future of RNA-based technology' (2023);
 'Edge computing, 6G and satellite communications' (2021);
 'Digital human rights and the future of democracy: Lessons from the pandemic' (2020);
 'Quantum technologies, artificial intelligence, cybersecurity' (2018);
 'Media in the age of artificial intelligence' (2017);
 'Towards a space-enabled future for Europe' (2016);
 'A discovery tour in the world of quantum optics' (2015) and;
 'Towards understanding the brain: Explained by a Nobel Prize winner' (2014).

In addition to these studies and Annual Lectures, STOA organises workshops and conferences on an average monthly basis.

In 2022, the STOA Panel established the EP Forum for Academic Freedom, as its new initiative. This authoritative platform monitors the state of play of the academic freedom in the EU Member States and offers a platform to all stakeholders to discuss how to protect the academic freedom in Europe. The EP Forum for Academic Freedom publishes studies and organises events to tackle the different aspects of academic freedom.

All the information related to STOA and its activities can be found on the @EP_ScienceTech Twitter account.

STOA is member of the European Parliamentary Technology Assessment (EPTA) network.

References

European Union and science and technology
International scientific organizations based in Europe
Technology assessment organisations